Sue Owen (born September 5, 1942) is a dark humor poet influenced by the work of W. S. Merwin, Charles Simic, and Mark Strand.  As the Poet-in-Residence, she taught poetry writing until 2005 at Louisiana State University in Baton Rouge.  She now lives in Cambridge, Massachusetts.

Career
Owen grew up Madison, Wisconsin, where she graduated from the University of Wisconsin with a Bachelor of Arts degree in English.  Later, at Goddard College, in Vermont, she obtained the Master of Fine Arts degree in Creating Writing.  Before joining the faculty at Louisiana State University, she taught a variety of poetry classes in the Baton Rouge community, including as a poet in the schools, at the public library, and at the Council on Aging.  In 1988, she won a national competition with the publication of her second book of poetry, and in 1998 she received recognition from the state of Louisiana as the Professional Artist of the Year.

Poetry awards
 Ohio State University Press/The Journal Award for The Book of Winter, 1988 
 Artist Fellowship in Poetry from the Louisiana Division of the Arts, 1993
 Governor's Arts Award from the Louisiana State Arts Council, 1998
 Teaching Grants in Poetry from the Louisiana Endowment for the Humanities, 1989-97
 Gretchen Warren Award from the New England Poetry Club, 2013

Poetry books
 Nursery Rhymes for the Dead (Ithaca: Ithaca House, 1980)
 The Book of Winter (Columbus: Ohio State University Press, 1988)
 My Doomsday Sampler (Baton Rouge: Louisiana State University Press, 1999)
 The Devil's Cookbook (Baton Rouge: Louisiana State University Press, 2007)
 Nursery Rhymes for the Dead: Collected Poems, translated by Ilya Lukovtsev (Moscow: Vodoley Press, 2018)

Selected anthologies
 The Best of Intro (Norfolk: Associated Writing Programs, 1985)
 Shared Sightings: An Anthology of Bird Poems (Santa Barbara: John Daniel & Co., 1995)
 Uncommonplace: An Anthology of Contemporary Louisiana Poets (Baton Rouge: Louisiana State University Press, 1998)
 Verse and Universe: Poems about Mathematics and Science (Minneapolis: Milkweed Editions, 1998)
 The Poetry Anthology, 1912-2002 (Chicago: Ivan R. Dee, 2002)

International publications
 Bonniers Litterära Magasin (BLM), Stockholm, Sweden, vol. 52, no. 6 (December, 1983): "Poem" and "The Fear"
 Horisont, Helsinki, Finland, vol. 30, no. 2 (March, 1983): "Journey," "The Book of Winter," "Cellar," and "The Obscure"
 USA Poetry  (Gothenburg, Sweden: Café Existens, 1984): "Lullaby," "The Spell," and "Fire"
 British Broadcasting Corporation (BBC-3) Archive, London, United Kingdom, "Words and Music: Apples," July 10, 2011: "The Poisoned Apple"  
 Arion, Moscow, Russia,  vol. 23, no. 2 (June, 2016): "Zero," "Old Potato Eyes," "Question," "Poem," "One Foot in the Grave," and "This is the Sparrow"

References

External links
 Louisiana State University Press, description of The Devil's Cookbook http://lsupress.org/books/detail/the-devil-s-cookbook/
 The Writer's Almanac, "A Basket of Buttons," by Sue Owen http://writersalmanac.publicradio.org/index.php?date=2001/04/28
 Verse Daily, "The Idea of Nothing" http://www.versedaily.org/aboutsueowennor.shtml
 Ploughshares, profile of Sue Owen https://www.pshares.org/authors/sue-owen
 Poets and Writers, profile of Sue Owen http://www.pw.org/content/sue_owen

1942 births
Living people
Writers from Madison, Wisconsin
American women poets
21st-century American poets
20th-century American poets
Poets from Massachusetts
Poets from Louisiana
Poets from Wisconsin
University of Wisconsin–Madison College of Letters and Science alumni
Goddard College alumni
Louisiana State University faculty
20th-century American women writers
21st-century American women writers
American women academics